The Griffin Commercial Historic District, in Griffin, Georgia, is a  historic district which was listed on the National Register of Historic Places in 1988.  It included 93 contributing buildings, two contributing structures, and a contributing site.  The district is roughly bounded by Central Alley, Sixth, Taylor and Eighth Streets.

The area, covering about eight city blocks, includes:
Griffin City Hall (the historic one, designed by Haralson Bleckley) 
Opera House/Odd Fellows Hall (1892), a Romanesque-style three-story brick building with stone details
Griffin Hotel (c.1910), designed by Atlanta architect Haralson Bleckley.  It is a brick two-story U-shaped building.
many other commercial buildings
at least three churches

References

Historic districts on the National Register of Historic Places in Georgia (U.S. state)
Italianate architecture in Georgia (U.S. state)
Late 19th and Early 20th Century American Movements architecture
Buildings and structures completed in 1895
Spalding County, Georgia